Chattahoochee Glacier is a glacier in the Convoy Range which flows northeast between Wyandot Ridge and Eastwind Ridge. It was mapped by the United States Geological Survey from ground surveys and from Navy air photos, and named by the Advisory Committee on Antarctic Names in 1964 for the USNS Chattahoochee, a tanker in the American convoy into McMurdo Sound in the 1961–62 and 1962–63 seasons.

References
 

Glaciers of Scott Coast